Miss Universe 2010 was the 59th Miss Universe pageant, held at the Mandalay Bay Events Center in Las Vegas, Nevada, United States on August 23, 2010. 

At the end of the event, Stefanía Fernández of Venezuela crowned Ximena Navarrete of Mexico as Miss Universe 2010. It is Mexico's second victory after their victory in 1991. 

Contestants from 83 countries and territories participated in this year's pageant. The pageant was hosted by Bret Michaels and Natalie Morales. John Legend, The Roots, and Cirque du Soleil performed in this year's pageant.

Background

Location and date 
Several cities from across the world had expressed interest to host the pageant. Among these cities that bid to host the pageant is Zagreb, Croatia which previously dropped its bid to host the pageant in 2009. The Croatian government and local investors renewed their proposal for the pageant, which would take place at the Arena Zagreb. However, on February 20, 2010, the national director of Miss Universe Croatia Vladimir Krajelvic announced that the country withdrew its bid to host the contest due to the impacts of the 2007-2008 financial crisis.

On January 31, 2010, the Miss Universe Organization was in talks to host the 2010 edition of the competition in Santa Cruz de la Sierra in Bolivia after the Miss Universe commission visited Bolivia to evaluate if the city is capable to host the pageant. However, during the visit of the commission in Bolivia, Minister of Culture Zulma Yugar publicly admitted the difficulties in hosting the pageant in line with the organization's demands. After a meeting held in La Paz in March 2010, Yugar formally announced that Santa Cruz withdrew its bid to host the pageant, alleging that the organization "disrespected the Constitution of Bolivia" and that the demands of the organization are financially impossible to attain.

After several cities withdrew its bid to host the pageant, on May 25, 2010, the Miss Universe Organization confirmed that the competition would be at the Mandalay Bay Events Center in Las Vegas, Nevada on August 23, 2010.

Selection of participants 
Contestants from 83 countries and territories were selected to compete in the competition. Two of these delegates were appointees to their positions after being a runner-up of their national pageant or being selected through a casting process, three were selected to replace the original dethroned winner, and another was crowned after the organization discovered that there was an error in the placements of the finalists.

Jéssica Schell, the second runner-up of Miss Guatemala 2010, was appointed to represent Guatemala after Alejandra Barillas, Miss Guatemala 2010, had a foot injury. Barillas competed in the pageant the following year. Alexandra Cătălina Filip, Miss Universe Romania 2010, was replaced by her first runner-up, Oana Paveluc, as she refused to sign the contract with the Miss Universe Organization preventing her from representing Romania at a major dance competition in South Korea. Serenay Sarikaya, Miss Turkey Universe 2010, was replaced by Miss Turkey 2010 Gizem Memiç as she wanted to continue her acting career.

Sandra Marinovič originally was crowned as Miss Universe Slovenia 2010. However, Marinovič was stripped of the crown after three days when the organization discovered that there was a computational error in transcribing the judges' scores. The official winner was Marika Savšek, who was previously placed as second runner-up.

Venus Raj originally was crowned Binibining Pilipinas Universe 2010. However, due to inconsistencies with her birth certificate, Raj was stripped off the title. The title was given to Helen Nicolette Henson, the 2nd Runner-Up of Binibining Pilipinas 2010. However, two months after her dethronement, Raj reclaimed her title as Binibining Pilipinas Universe 2010 after obtaining a legal Philippine passport.

The 2010 edition saw the returns of Botswana, the British Virgin Islands, Denmark, Haiti, Kazakhstan, Sri Lanka, Trinidad and Tobago, and the United States Virgin Islands. Haiti last competed in 1989, making the first time the country competed after two decades of withdrawal. The British Virgin Islands last competed in 2002, Botswana last competed in 2004, the US Virgin Islands last competed in 2007, while the others last competed in 2008. Bulgaria, the Cayman Islands, Estonia, Ethiopia, Iceland, Montenegro, Namibia, and Vietnam withdrew from the pageant. Nikolina Lončar, Miss Montenegro 2010, was replaced by Marijana Pokrajac as the representative of Montenegro due to being underage. However, Pokrajac withdrew due to undisclosed reasons. Lončar competed in the pageant the following year. Odile Gertze, Miss Namibia 2010, withdrew due to being crowned one week from the official start of Miss Universe 2010. Phạm Thị Thanh Hằng of Vietnam withdrew due to lack of preparation. Bulgaria, the Cayman Islands, Estonia, Ethiopia, and Iceland withdrew from the competition after its respective organization failed to hold a national competition or appoint a delegate.

Results

Placements

Final Scores

Special awards

Pageant

Format 
Same with 2007, 15 semifinalists were chosen through the preliminary competition— composed of the swimsuit and evening gown competitions and closed-door interviews. The top 15 competed in the swimsuit competition and were narrowed down to the top 10 afterward. The top 10 competed in the evening gown competition and were narrowed down to the top 5 afterward. The top 5 competed in the question and answer round and the final look.

Selection committee

Preliminary competition 
 Basim Shami – President of Farouk Systems
 BJ Coleman – Publicist, Journalist & Television Personality
 Carlos Bremer – CEO and General Director of Value Grupo Financiero
 Corinne Nicolas – President of Trump Model Management
 Louis Burgdorf – Talent Producer for MSNBC's Joe Scarborough & Mika Brzezinski
 Natalie Rotman – Television Host and Fashion Expert
 Sadoux Kim – Television producer

Final telecast 
Niki Taylor – Model
William Baldwin – Actor, producer and writer
Chynna Phillips – Singer and actress
Evan Lysacek – Olympic Gold Medal Figure Skater and Dancing with the Stars finalist
Tamron Hall – MSNBC anchor
Chazz Palminteri – Actor and writer
Jane Seymour – Actress and Dancing with the Stars participant
Criss Angel – Illusionist and musician
Sheila E. – Musician

Contestants 
83 contestants competed for the title.

Notes

References

External links
Miss Universe official website

2010
2010 beauty pageants
Beauty pageants in the United States
2010 in Nevada
Events in Las Vegas
August 2010 events in the United States